The 1869 Wigtown Burghs by-election was held on 4 January 1869.  The by-election was held due to the incumbent Liberal MP, George Young, becoming Solicitor General for Scotland.  It was retained by Young who was unopposed.

References

Politics of Dumfries and Galloway
1869 elections in the United Kingdom
1869 in Scotland
1860s elections in Scotland
By-elections to the Parliament of the United Kingdom in Scottish constituencies
Wigtownshire
Unopposed ministerial by-elections to the Parliament of the United Kingdom in English constituencies
January 1869 events